After I'm Gone is a book written by Laura Lippman and published by William Morrow Publishers (an imprint of HarperCollins) on February 11, 2014; it won the Anthony Award for Best Novel in 2015.

References

External links 
 Family Life Was Complicated, Then the Body Turned Up
 Book review: After I’m Gone by Laura Lippman
 ‘After I’m Gone’ by Laura Lippman

Anthony Award-winning works
2014 American novels
American mystery novels
William Morrow and Company books